The RS-27 was a liquid-propellant rocket engine developed in 1974 by Rocketdyne to replace the aging MB-3 in the Delta.  Incorporating components of the venerable MB-3 and the H-1 designs, the RS-27 was a modernized version of the basic design used for two decades.  It was used to power the first stage of the Delta 2000, 3000, 5000, and the first model of the Delta II, the Delta 6000.

The RS-27 was a modified Rocketdyne H-1 built to power the first stage of the Saturn I and Saturn IB and replaced the MB-3 engine that had been used on previous versions of the Delta launcher.  NASA had a large supply of surplus H-1 engines in the early 1970s, as the Apollo program was ending. In addition to its main engine, the RS-27 included two vernier engines to provide vehicle roll control during flight. RS-27 was later developed into the RS-27A and RS-56.

References

Rocketdyne engines
Rocket engines using the gas-generator cycle
Rocket engines using kerosene propellant
Rocket engines of the United States